Pakistan Embassy College Beijing (PECB;) is a Pakistan International School located on the Embassy of Pakistan compound in Sanlitun, Chaoyang District, Beijing. It serves students ages 4–19, in kindergarten through senior school.

History 
The school was established in 1969. Initially, it was known as Pakistan School Beijing. It was the first foreign school in Beijing. 

In 1970, it relocated to a structure with 14 classrooms, and in 1975, secondary levels were added. In December 1980, it relocated to its present location inside the embassy complex. 

In June 2017, the school had 500 pupils registered, 50% of them were foreigners from 56 different countries. At the time, the institution employed 45 Chinese and Pakistani faculty members.

In 2019, a Chinese language laboratory was inaugurated at the college.

There is a student council at the college and elections are held annually.

Sports team
 Football

See also
 China–Pakistan relations

References

External links
 Pakistan Embassy College Beijing
 
 International School Listings

Pakistani international schools in Asia
International schools in Beijing
China–Pakistan relations
1969 establishments in China
Educational institutions established in 1969
High schools in Beijing
Schools in Chaoyang District, Beijing